The Houston Negro Hospital is the original name of a hospital in Houston, Texas.  Upon the completion of an expansion project to add an extra wing to the hospital in 1961, the entire facility was renamed Riverside General Hospital.

The original building, located at 3204 Ennis Street, was added to the National Register of Historic Places on December 27, 1982.

See also
 Houston Negro Hospital School of Nursing Building
 National Register of Historic Places listings in Harris County, Texas

References

1926 establishments in Texas
African-American history of Texas
Historically black hospitals in the United States
Hospital buildings completed in 1926
Hospitals established in 1926
Hospital buildings on the National Register of Historic Places in Texas
Hospitals in Houston
National Register of Historic Places in Houston
Spanish Colonial Revival architecture in Texas